This is a list of the England women's national football team results from 2010 to 2019.

Results

2010

2011

2012

2013

2014

2015

2016

2017

2018

2019

References

2010s in England
2010s